Patrick Mawlai Kazadi (born 29 March 1977) is a DR Congolese footballer.

He has played for Tunisian club and he was so good, his father won a trophy saying that he is the third best goal keeper in Africa long time ago. Patrick played in this teams  A.S. Marsa and EGS Gafsa, Al Wahda of Saudi Arabia, Al Khaleej of the UAE, and Libyan club Tersanah.

References 

1982 births
Living people
Sportspeople from Brazzaville
Association football forwards
AS Marsa players
Al-Wehda Club (Mecca) players
Khor Fakkan Sports Club players
EGS Gafsa players
Democratic Republic of the Congo footballers
Democratic Republic of the Congo international footballers
Democratic Republic of the Congo expatriate footballers
Republic of the Congo footballers
Republic of the Congo expatriate footballers
Expatriate footballers in Tunisia
Expatriate footballers in Libya
Saudi Professional League players
UAE Pro League players